Miriam Feirberg-Ikar (born 11 July 1951) is an Israeli politician currently serving as the mayor of Netanya, a city in the Central District of Israel. Feirberg is the first (elected) female mayor in Netanya and one of the few women who have served as mayors of Israeli cities.

She was born in Acre, a city in northern Israel. Her father was an officer in the Israel Border Police, and her mother was a social worker. She obtained her Bachelor of Arts degree in sociology, criminology and social work, and her Master of Arts degree in social work, both from Bar-Ilan University. From 1972 to 1988 Feirberg was a social worker and the executive of the social services department in the city hall of Netanya. From 1988 to 1993 she was the head of the welfare and health administration in the city hall. From 1993 to 1998 Feirberg was a city councilwoman and the culture superior on behalf of the city. Feirberg was elected as mayor of Netanya in 1998, elected again in 2003, in 2008, in 2013 and in 2018.

Feirberg was married to Eli Feirberg, and they have a son, Tzafrir, and a daughter, Tal. In 2004 she married Roni Ikar, who two years earlier she had appointed as the CEO of Netanya municipality. Ikar quit his job, and as of today (2006) he is the CEO of Ahuzot Hahof, which operates the Tel Aviv municipality's parking lots.

Feirberg won several prizes, included a prize for efficient management (1990) from the Union of Local Authorities in Israel.

The Israel police arrested Feirberg and several of her colleagues and relatives in September 2016 on suspicion of bribery, fraud, and abuse of power in connection with an investigation into alleged municipal corruption by Lahav 433. In June 2019, however, the investigation against Feirberg was closed, after State Prosecutor Shai Nitzan and other officials found a lack of evidence against Feirberg. Prosecutors are pursuing charges against Netanya Deputy Mayor Shimon Sher.

References

1951 births
Bar-Ilan University alumni
Israeli people of Romanian-Jewish descent
Israeli social workers
Jewish mayors
Living people
Mayors of places in Israel
People from Netanya
People from Acre, Israel
Women mayors of places in Israel
Jewish women politicians